Odette may refer to:

Arts and entertainment
 Odette (play), an 1881 play by Victorien Sardou
 Odette (1916 film), an Italian silent drama film based on the Sardou play
 Odette (1928 film), a German silent drama film based on the Sardou play
 Odette (1934 film), an Italian drama film based on the Sardou play
 Odette (1950 film), a British war film about Odette Sansom
 Odette, heroine of Tchaikovsky's ballet Swan Lake
 , an 1847 ballet by Jules Perrot
 Odette, a character in Marcel Proust's Swann's Way, volume 1 of In Search of Lost Time

People
 Odette (given name), people with the given name Odette
 Odette (musician) (born 1997), British-born Australian musician
 Odette Sansom (1912–1995) French Special Operations Executive agent
 Edmond George Odette (1884–1939), Canadian politician
 Mary Odette, stage name of Marie Odette Goimbault (1901–1987), French-born British actress
 Terrance Odette, Canadian film director and screenwriter
 Yvonne Baseden (1922–2017), Special Operations Executive agent with the field name Odette

Other uses
 List of storms named Odette, tropical cyclones with this name
 Odette (restaurant), a Michelin-starred restaurant in Singapore
 Odette FTP, a file transfer protocol

See also
 
 Odet (disambiguation)
 Odets (disambiguation)